Qingquan Temple is a Buddhist temple located in Shuimogou District of Ürümqi, Xinjiang, China.

History 
The original temple was built between 627 and 649, under the Tang dynasty (618–907). It was completely destroyed by the Red Guards during the ten-year Cultural Revolution.

After the 3rd Plenary Session of the 11th Central Committee of the Chinese Communist Party, the local government decided to rebuild the temple on its original site. Reconstruction of the temple, led by Wang Chengzhang, commenced in 1988 and was completed in 1998. In the early morning of 29 September 2013, a disastrous fire consumed the Mahavira Hall.

Architecture 
Now the existing main buildings include Shanmen, Heavenly Kings Hall, Mahavira Hall, Guanyin Hall, Maitreya Hall, Dharma Hall, Dining Room, etc.

List of abbot 
 Shi Jiren

References 

Buddhist temples in Xinjiang
Buildings and structures in Ürümqi
Tourist attractions in Xinjiang
20th-century establishments in China
20th-century Buddhist temples
Religious buildings and structures completed in 1998